Abram is a village in the Metropolitan Borough of Wigan, Greater Manchester, England.  The village and the settlement of Platt Bridge contain two listed buildings that are recorded in the National Heritage List for England.  Both the listed buildings are designated at Grade II, the lowest of the three grades, which is applied to "buildings of national importance and special interest".  The listed buildings are a house and a farmhouse.
 

Buildings

References

Citations

Sources

Lists of listed buildings in Greater Manchester